William, Will, Willie, Bill, or Billy Richardson may refer to:

Government and politics

Ireland
William Richardson (1656–1727), MP for Armagh and Hillsborough
William Richardson (died 1755) (1690–1755), MP for Augher
William Richardson (1710–1758), MP for Armagh
William Richardson (1749–1822), MP for Armagh
Sir William Richardson, 1st Baronet (died 1830), MP for Augher and Ballyshannon

United States
Bill Richardson (born 1947), Governor of New Mexico, U.S. Secretary of Energy, Congressman; 2008 Presidential candidate
Friend Richardson (William Richardson, 1865–1943), 25th governor of California
H. L. Richardson (Hubert Leon "Bill" Richardson, 1927–2020), California state senator
Willy Bo Richardson (born 1974), American artist
William Richardson (Maryland politician) (1735–1825), Revolutionary War soldier
William Richardson (Mississippi politician) (1951-1997), Mississippi politician and teacher
William Richardson (South Carolina politician) (1743-1786), South Carolina politician
William Adams Richardson (1821–1896), Treasury secretary
William Alexander Richardson (1811–1875), U.S. senator from Illinois
William B. Richardson (1874–1945), Minnesota state senator
William Emanuel Richardson (1886–1948), U.S. representatives from Pennsylvania
William Henry Richardson (1808–1878), Connecticut state legislator
William M. Richardson (1774–1838), U.S. representative from Massachusetts, 1811–1814
William Richardson (Alabama politician) (1839–1914), U.S. representative from Alabama, 1900–1914
William P. Richardson (Ohio politician) (1824–1886), Republican politician from the state of Ohio, USA
William P. Richardson (law school dean) (1864–1945), American co-founder and first Dean of Brooklyn Law School
William P. Richardson (New York politician) (1848–1923), New York politician
William S. Richardson (1919–2010), lieutenant governor of Hawaii
William O. Richardson (born 1954), American politician
William U. Richardson, lawyer and member of the Louisiana House of Representatives

Other
William Richardson (colonial administrator) (died 1829), Deputy Governor of Anguilla
William Westbrooke Richardson, High Sheriff of Sussex in 1770

Sports
William Richardson (Cambridge University cricketer) (1861–1933), English cricketer with Cambridge University
William Richardson (Worcestershire cricketer) (1894–1971), English cricketer with Worcestershire
William Richardson (Derbyshire cricketer) (born 1938), English cricketer with Derbyshire
William Richardson (New South Wales cricketer) (1866–1930), Australian cricketer with New South Wales
Bill Richardson (athlete) (1903–1969), American Olympic runner
William "Ginger" Richardson, known as W. G. Richardson (1909–1959), English footballer
William Richardson (footballer) (1880–1903), Australian rules footballer
Billy Richardson (footballer, born 1896) (1896–1959), English footballer
Bill Richardson (footballer, born 1908) (1908–1985), English footballer 
Bill Richardson (footballer, born 1943), English footballer
Billy Richardson (died 2004), Irish soccer player
Willie Richardson (1939–2016), American football wide receiver
Bill Richardson (baseball) (1878–1949), American baseball player

Willie Richardson (wrestler), member of Da Soul Touchaz
Will Richardson (basketball) (born 1999), American basketball player
Will Richardson (American football) (born 1996), American football player

Religion
William Richardson (martyr) (1572–1603),  beatified Roman Catholic martyr
William Richardson (bishop) (1844–1915), Anglican Bishop of Zanzibar, 1895–1901

Academics
William Richardson (antiquary) (1698–1775), English academic and antiquary
William Richardson (classicist) (1743–1814), Scottish professor and scholar
William Richardson (astronomer) (1796–1872), British astronomer
William J. Richardson (1920–2016), American philosopher
William C. Richardson (born 1940), President of Johns Hopkins University, 1990–1995
William D. Richardson (born 1951), Director of the UCL Wolfson Institute since 2012
William Bebb Richardson (1912–2006), American mammalogist

Other
William Anthony Richardson (1795–1856), sea captain and early California entrepreneur
William Blaney Richardson (1868–1927), American-Nicaraguan naturalist
W. P. Richardson (trade unionist) (William Pallister Richardson, 1873–1930), British trade unionist
William R. Richardson (born 1929), U.S. Army general
William R. Richardson (Medal of Honor), Union Army soldier and Medal of Honor recipient
William Richardson (songwriter), Tyneside songwriter
Will Richardson (educator), author and blogger
Bill Richardson (journalist) (1909–1986), British newspaper editor
Bill Richardson (broadcaster) (born 1955), Canadian radio broadcaster and author
Billy Richardson (Pony Express rider)